Thirst is a 1979 Australian horror film directed by Rod Hardy and starring Chantal Contouri, Max Phipps, and David Hemmings. It has been described as a blend of vampire and science fiction genres, influenced by the 1973 film Soylent Green as well as drawing on the vampire folklore of Elizabeth Báthory – one of several vampire films in the 1970s to do so.

Plot
Single professional Kate Davis is kidnapped by a shadowy organization known as 'The Brotherhood'. This organization believes her to be a direct descendant of Elizabeth Báthory and claim to be part of an ancient race that consumes blood in order to retain their youth and strength. They have taken her to a hospital-like compound where they clinically 'bleed' brainwashed and hypnotised humans and harvest and consume their blood. Kate is horrified by what she sees and refuses to join, as well as to take one of the Brotherhood as a mate. She manages to steal a truck and flee the compound, but is captured. 

Kate continues to be unreceptive to the Brotherhood and their practices, leading to them using hallucinogens to break down her resistance. Only one member, Dr. Fraser, is against this treatment as he believes that it will only result in losing her respect for them even if it was successful. Kate is brainwashed and initiated into the cult through a ceremony that involves her using fake metallic fangs to drink the blood of a sacrificial victim.

Once home Kate acts as if she has seemingly forgotten all of what has happened, only for her to end up killing a woman in her apartment and drinking her blood. Once back at the compound Kate is still resistant to drinking blood and taking the lives of other humans. In an attempt to make her comply the Brotherhood kidnaps her lover Derek and takes him to the farm. Dr. Fraser helps him escape and seeks out Kate, seemingly in attempt to reunite them, only to reveal he is also descended from a vampire lineage and seeks a union with her. He did save Derek from the farm, but only so he could drain Derek's blood and offer it to Kate. Initially angry at seeing Derek's drained body, Kate's will is finally broken and she submits to Dr. Fraser and the Brotherhood.

Cast

Production
The artists' colony of Montsalvat north of Melbourne was used as the cult's headquarters. Producer Ginnane had sought out Hemmings and American Henry Silva in supporting roles to bolster the film's popularity outside Australia.

Producer Antony I. Ginnane followed his then-usual practice of hiring new directors from television by giving the job of directing to Rod Hardy.

Release

Critical response
Released on 28 September 1979 in Australia, the film did not do well at the local box office. Nevertheless, it was highly regarded by influential American film critic Leonard Maltin, who gave it three stars out of four.

On review aggregator Rotten Tomatoes the film holds a rare 100% fresh rating from 5 reviews.

Home media
Synapse Films released Thirst on DVD in October 2008. In 2014, Severin Films released the film in a Blu-ray and DVD combination set.

See also
Cinema of Australia
Vampire film

References

External links

Thirst at Australian Screen Online
Thirst at Oz Movies

1979 films
1979 horror films
Vampires in film
1970s science fiction horror films
Australian horror films
1979 directorial debut films
Films shot in Melbourne
Films directed by Rod Hardy
Films scored by Brian May (composer)
Cultural depictions of Elizabeth Báthory
New Line Cinema films
Australian science fiction horror films
1970s exploitation films
Australian splatter films
1970s English-language films